The Birecik Dam, one of the 21 dams of the Southeastern Anatolia Project of Turkey, is located on the Euphrates River   downstream of Atatürk Dam and  upstream of Birecik town  west of Province of Şanlıurfa in the southeastern region of Turkey. It was purposed  for irrigation and energy production. There is a run-of-the-river hydroelectric power plant, established in 2001, at the dam, with a power output of 672MW (six facilities at 112 MW each) can generate an average of 2.5 billion kWh per year. It was designed by Coyne et Bellier. The Birecik project will be realized under the status of Build-Operate-Transfer (BOT) model.

The dam was built on top of the ruins of the ancient city of Zeugma. According to Bogumil Terminski (2015), the construction of the dam resulted in resettlement of approximately 6,000 people.

See also

 List of power stations in Turkey

References

External links
 United Nations Southeast Anatolia Sustainable Human Development Program (GAP) 
 Current status of GAP as of June 2000
 Official GAP web site

Dams completed in 2000
Energy infrastructure completed in 2001
Dams in Gaziantep Province
Hydroelectric power stations in Turkey
Southeastern Anatolia Project
Run-of-the-river power stations
Dams on the Euphrates River
Dams in Şanlıurfa Province
Crossings of the Euphrates
21st-century architecture in Turkey